Troy Jackson was an American basketball player. The younger brother of retired NBA player Mark Jackson, he was a member of the AND1 Mixtape Tour, known by his streetball nickname "Escalade". Jackson was listed by AND1 at 6'10" and 375 pounds.

Jackson enrolled at Wallace, and even though he continued to play at 500 pounds (or more), he received all-region honors as a sophomore. "People wonder how I played at 500-plus pounds. But to me it felt natural," he later said. Jackson's accomplishments in community college led to a scholarship offer from the University of Louisville, though the school demanded that he lose weight. Jackson complied, and by his senior year at Louisville, he had slimmed down to about  after adhering to a strict diet.

Jackson only played twenty games for Louisville over two years, averaging 3.0 points per game and 1.6 rebounds per game in a reserve role. However, he became well-known to basketball fans through the AND1 Mixtape Tour, a traveling streetball exhibition which he joined in 2002. With the AND1 Tour, Jackson used the nickname Escalade, a reference to the Cadillac SUV. His teammate Antwan "8th Wonder" Scott told the Herald Sun, "He's a big guy, but he can entertain and he can seriously play." Jackson appeared on the cover of Sports Illustrated  and was described as a "streetball legend" by the magazine Jet.

Off the basketball court, Jackson worked as an advocate for STD prevention. He died in his sleep of hypertensive heart disease on February 20, 2011.

References

External links
College statistics at Sports Reference

 

1973 births
2011 deaths
AND1
Basketball players from New York City
American men's basketball players
Deaths from hypertensions
Junior college men's basketball players in the United States
Louisville Cardinals men's basketball players
Sportspeople from Queens, New York
Street basketball players